Ramiro Cabrera González (born 8 February 1988 in Tacuarembó) is a Uruguayan former professional cyclist.

Major results

2008
 1st Stage 1 Rutas de América
 3rd Overall Vuelta del Uruguay
 10th Road race, Pan American Road Championships
2009
 1st Overall Volta Ciclistica Internacional de Gravataí
1st Stage 1
 2nd Overall Rutas de América
2010
 National Under-23 Road Championships
2nd Road race
3rd Time trial
 3rd Overall Vuelta del Uruguay
 4th Overall Rutas de América
 10th Time trial, Pan American Road Championships
2012
 9th Overall Vuelta del Uruguay
2015
 Volta do Paraná
1st Stages 4 & 5
 10th Overall Vuelta del Uruguay
2016
 6th Overall Vuelta del Uruguay

References

External links

1988 births
Living people
Uruguayan male cyclists
People from Tacuarembó